Ogledalo may refer to:

Ogledalo (Peychinovich book), a religious collection written by Kiril Peychinovich in modern Bulgarian
Ogledalo (group), a Serbian chamber music theater group formed by Boris Kovač
"Ogledalo," a song by Bulgarian rock band Ostava